William "Duke" Procter (August 18, 1899 – December 14, 2005) was a Canadian veteran of the First World War and the last remaining veteran of that war from western Canada. At the time of his death, there were only three known remaining Canadian World War I veterans.

He was born in Mabel Lake, British Columbia, where he learned at an early age how to drive horses and haul wood. He joined the Canadian Army in 1916, went to England as a member of the 172nd Rocky Mountain Rangers Infantry and was put to work cutting timber for use on the front lines in France because, at 16, he was considered too young for active duty. After his discharge, he returned to Mabel Lake, where he continued to work at logging, and later settled on a farm. After his retirement at the age of 67, he moved to Vernon, British Columbia. Procter held the record as being the oldest person ever to compete in the Canadian Horseshoe Championships, participating in 1997 and 1998, and celebrated his 100th birthday by skydiving. He continued to drive his own car until the age of 101. He moved into a senior's home at 105 after a fall left him less mobile.

He received the Queen's Golden Jubilee Medal in 2004.

He died at Oakside Manor residential care facility in Enderby, British Columbia at the age of 106.

External links 
CBC News story
The Memory Project - Globe and Mail
Veterans Affairs Canada page
Duke Procter's Webpage

1899 births
2005 deaths
Canadian Army soldiers
Canadian centenarians
Canadian Expeditionary Force soldiers
Men centenarians
People from the Regional District of North Okanagan
Canadian military personnel from British Columbia